The 1986 Kangaroo tour of Great Britain and France was the sixteenth Kangaroo tour in which the Australian national rugby league team (known as the Winfield Kangaroos due to sponsorship) plays a number of tour matches against British and French teams, in addition to the Test matches. The next Kangaroo tour was staged in 1990.

Australia continued its dominance, easily winning both Test series against Great Britain and France as well as defeating Papua New Guinea in Port Moresby on the way to England, going through the entire tour undefeated in a repeat of the 1982 Invincibles' tour which saw the 1986 team became known as "The Unbeatables". In twenty matches they scored 136 tries and conceded only 16, posting 738 points for and 126 against. Terry Lamb became the first player to appear in every match on a Kangaroo Tour.

The team was coached by 1956/57 Kangaroo tourist Don Furner, who also coached the Canberra Raiders in the NSWRL that year. The squad was captained by Queensland captain Wally Lewis, the first time a Queensland based player had captained a Kangaroo tour since Tom Gorman led the 1929–30 Kangaroo tour of Great Britain. Peter Sterling was named as the tour's vice-captain, while the tour managers were Gordon Treichel and John Fleming.

National Panasonic put up AU$5,000 worth of products for the Australian player who voted as player of the tour. Team sponsor Winfield also put up $1,000 for the Australian player judged the player of the match for each Test match played on the tour.

Squad
Of the 28 players selected to go on the tour 23 were from clubs of the New South Wales Rugby League and 5 were from clubs of the Brisbane Rugby League. This was the last time players from the Queensland-based competition were selected for a Kangaroo tour.

There were a couple of notable omissions from the touring team. Parramatta Eels test winger Eric Grothe had originally been selected in the side and even had pre-tour publicity photos taken with the rest of the team. However he was ruled out late with the recurrence of a knee injury and his place was taken by young Penrith halfback Greg Alexander. The other was regular Australian vice-captain Wayne Pearce who had ruptured his Anterior cruciate ligament during the 1986 Trans-Tasman Test series against New Zealand in July. Despite an intense rehabilitation program, and being passed as fit by his surgeon, Dr Merv Cross, Pearce was ruled out of the tour by team medico Dr Bill Monoghan after a pre-tour team physical conducted at Redfern Oval in Sydney.

Surprisingly, the 1986 NSWRL Winfield Cup premiers Parramatta only supplied two players to the Kangaroos squad (vice-captain Peter Sterling and Brett Kenny). Conversely, the 1986 Brisbane premiers Wynnum-Manly supplied four players to the squad (captain Wally Lewis, Greg Dowling, Bob Lindner and Gene Miles). With the exception of Dowling who did not play the pre-tour test against Papua New Guinea, all six 1986 premiership winners played in each test on the tour.

NOTE: Statistics only show games in Great Britain and France and do not include the test against Papua New Guinea

|- bgcolor="#CCCCFF"
| Player
| Club
| Position(s)
| Games (sub)
| Tests (sub)
| Tries
| Goals
| Points
|-
|- bgcolor="#FFFFFF"
|  Greg Alexander
|  Penrith Panthers
| 
| 9 (1)
| -
| 10
| 5 
| 50 
|-
|- bgcolor="#FFFFFF"
|  Gary Belcher
|  Canberra Raiders
| 
| 10
| -
| 6
| 0
| 24
|-
|- bgcolor="#FFFFFF"
|  Martin Bella
|  North Sydney Bears
| 
| 8 (2)
| -
| 1
| 0
| 4
|-
|- bgcolor="#FFFFFF"
|  Noel Cleal
|  Manly-Warringah Sea Eagles
| 
| 7
| 2
| 3
| 0
| 12
|-
|- bgcolor="#FFFFFF"
|  Phil Daley
|  Manly-Warringah Sea Eagles
| 
| 7
| -
| 0
| 0
| 0
|-
|- bgcolor="#FFFFFF"
|  Les Davidson
|  South Sydney Rabbitohs
| 
| 14
| 3 (2)
| 0
| 0
| 0
|-
|- bgcolor="#FFFFFF"
|  Greg Dowling
|  Wynnum-Manly Seagulls (Qld)
| 
| 11
| 5
| 1
| 0
| 4
|-
|- bgcolor="#FFFFFF"
|  Paul Dunn
|  Canterbury-Bankstown Bulldogs
| 
| 11
| 4
| 0
| 0
| 0
|-
|- bgcolor="#FFFFFF"
|  Ben Elias
|  Balmain Tigers
| 
| 10
| -
| 3
| 0
| 12
|-
|- bgcolor="#FFFFFF"
|  Steve Folkes
|  Canterbury-Bankstown Bulldogs
| 
| 6
| 1
| 1
| 0
| 4
|-
|- bgcolor="#FFFFFF"
|  Des Hasler
|  Manly-Warringah Sea Eagles
| 
| 8
| -
| 4
| 0
| 16
|-
|- bgcolor="#FFFFFF"
|  Garry Jack
|  Balmain Tigers
| 
| 12
| 5
| 12
| 0
| 48
|-
|- bgcolor="#FFFFFF"
|  Brett Kenny
|  Parramatta Eels
| 
| 14
| 5
| 8
| 0
| 32
|-
|- bgcolor="#FFFFFF"
|  Les Kiss
|  North Sydney Bears
| 
| 4
| 1
| 1
| 0
| 4
|-
|- bgcolor="#FFFFFF"
|  Terry Lamb
|  Canterbury-Bankstown Bulldogs
| 
| 20
| 5 (5)
| 19
| 20
| 116
|-
|- bgcolor="#FFFFFF"
|  Paul Langmack
|  Canterbury-Bankstown Bulldogs
| 
| 10
| -
| 3
| 0
| 12
|-
|- bgcolor="#FFFFFF"
|  Wally Lewis (c)
|  Wynnum-Manly Seagulls (Qld)
| 
| 11
| 5
| 6
| 0
| 24
|-
|- bgcolor="#FFFFFF"
|  Bob Lindner
|  Wynnum-Manly Seagulls (Qld)
| 
| 10
| 5
| 6
| 0
| 24
|-
|- bgcolor="#FFFFFF"
|  Mal Meninga
|  Canberra Raiders
| 
| 13
| 3 (2)
| 9
| 7
| 50
|-
|- bgcolor="#FFFFFF"
|  Gene Miles
|  Wynnum-Manly Seagulls (Qld)
| 
| 13
| 5
| 8
| 0
| 32
|-
|- bgcolor="#FFFFFF"
|  Chris Mortimer
|  Canterbury-Bankstown Bulldogs
| 
| 9
| -
| 4
| 0
| 32
|-
|- bgcolor="#FFFFFF"
|  Bryan Niebling
|  Redcliffe Dolphins (Qld)
| 
| 10
| 5
| 2
| 0
| 8
|-
|- bgcolor="#FFFFFF"
|  Michael O'Connor
|  St George Dragons
| 
| 14
| 5
| 13
| 59
| 170
|-
|- bgcolor="#FFFFFF"
|  Steve Roach
|  Balmain Tigers
| 
| 8
| 1
| 3
| 0
| 12
|-
|- bgcolor="#FFFFFF"
|  Dale Shearer
|  Manly-Warringah Sea Eagles
| 
| 13
| 4
| 12
| 0
| 48
|-
|- bgcolor="#FFFFFF"
|  Royce Simmons
|  Penrith Panthers
| 
| 10
| 5
| 1
| 0
| 4
|-
|- bgcolor="#FFFFFF"
|  Paul Sironen
|  Balmain Tigers
| 
| 10
| 1
| 0
| 0
| 0
|-
|- bgcolor="#FFFFFF"
|  Peter Sterling (vc)
|  Parramatta Eels
| 
| 10
| 5
| 3
| 0
| 12
|-

By Club
The touring side was represented by 18 New South Welshmen (N) and 10 Queenslanders (Q).

 Canterbury-Bankstown Bulldogs (5): Paul Dunn (N), Steve Folkes (N), Terry Lamb (N), Paul Langmack (N), Chris Mortimer (N)
 Balmain Tigers (4): Ben Elias (N), Garry Jack (N), Steve Roach (N), Paul Sironen (N)
 Manly-Warringah Sea Eagles (4): Noel Cleal (N), Phil Daley (N), Des Halser (N), Dale Shearer (Q)
 Wynnum-Manly Seagulls (4): Wally Lewis (captain) (Q), Greg Dowling (Q), Bob Lindner (Q), Gene Miles (Q)
 Canberra Raiders (2): Gary Belcher (Q), Mal Meninga (Q)
 North Sydney Bears (2): Martin Bella (Q), Les Kiss (Q)
 Parramatta Eels (2): Peter Sterling (N) (vice-captain), Brett Kenny (N)
 Penrith Panthers (2): Greg Alexander (N), Royce Simmons (N)
 Redcliffe Dolphins (1): Bryan Niebling (Q)
 South Sydney Rabbitohs (1): Les Davidson (N)
 St George Dragons (1): Michael O'Connor (N)

Papua New Guinea
Before flying to England, the Kangaroos played their second ever Test against Papua New Guinea at the Lloyd Robson Oval in Port Moresby on 4 October. In front of 17,000 fans (still the record attendance for the venue as of 2017), the Wally Lewis led Kangaroos defeated the Kumuls 62–12. Reserve Australian forward Paul Sironen made his test debut in the game.
This was the first of three test matches on the tour that counted towards the ongoing 1985-1988 Rugby League World Cup

Great Britain
The Kangaroos played 13 games in England, including the three Ashes tests against Great Britain. Australia kept alive its streak of not having lost to an English club or provincial team since 1978. The English leg of the tour drew a total of 212,068 fans to the 13 games (including the three tests).

Test Venues
The three Ashes series tests took place at the following venues.

The Kangaroos led 16–2 at half time in front of 30,622 fans (the record for a Wigan vs Australia match on a Kangaroo Tour) in the tour opener at Wigan (more than 10,000 than would attend the dead rubber 3rd test at the same ground some 6 weeks later). A fightback in the second half by the home side saw them close the game to just 8 points at full time.

The attendance at this game (30,622) was the largest crowd the Kangaroos had played in front of in England since 30,604 attended the 3rd Ashes Test at Headingley on the 1978 Kangaroo tour. It was also the highest ever tour game attendance against Wigan beating the 28,554 who attended the match at Central Park between Wigan and the 1948–49 Kangaroos captained by Clive Churchill.

All of Hull KR's points were scored by Australian's. Former Wests, Manly and Illawarra back John Dorahy kicked 3 goals for the Robins while 1978 and 1982 Kangaroo tourist and 25 test veteran Kerry Boustead scored the only try for the home team with all 10 points coming in the first half. For the Kangaroos, Terry Lamb crossed for 5 of the teams 9 tries. Australian halfback Des Hasler broke his hand in the first half and was replaced by Greg Alexander. Hasler's injury would keep him out of action for a month and he would not return to the field until the 11th game of the tour against Hull F.C. at The Boulevard.

For the match at Craven Park, Kangaroo tour broadcaster Network Ten had to hire extra lighting to bring the lights up to broadcasting standard. It would become a common theme and problem during tour games for Ten with all bar the Ashes tests and the games against Wigan, Leeds and Hull F.C. being played at night at grounds where the lighting was usually not up to broadcast standard.

Leeds were unlucky not to be awarded a try midway through the second half after it appeared that replacement forward Trevor Skerrett had managed to get the ball down after good lead up work by former Great Britain international Jeff Greyshon. However an un-sighted referee Whitfield ruled that Skerrett had been held up in-goal. Leeds only other scoring opportunity came in the first half but young winger David Creasser missed a relatively simple penalty kick from in front of the posts. Leeds' centre pairing for the game were Cronulla-Sutherland imports Andrew Ettingshausen and Mark McGaw who would play against Leeds for Australia on the 1990 Kangaroo tour.

The Kangaroos only match against a full county lineup was played in front of the English leg's smallest crowd of just 4,233 at Craven Park in Barrow-in-Furness. As of 2017 this would be the 11th last game the Kangaroos played at the home of the Barrow club.

The Ashes

1st Ashes Test
The crowd of 50,583 for the first Test at the Old Trafford ground in Manchester, set a record for an international match on British soil, beating the previous record of 42,685 for an England vs New Zealand test at the Odsal Stadium in Bradford in 1947. The Ashes series against Great Britain saw an aggregate Ashes series crowd of 101,560 attending the three Tests, though this fell short of the record aggregate attendance of 114,883 set during the 1948–49 Kangaroo tour.

The Kangaroos began their Ashes defence in a blaze of glory. Wet and windy conditions were the order of the day at Old Trafford as Gene Miles (who completely out-played Ellery Hanley) and Michael O'Connor crossed for 3 tries each. O'Connor also contributed 5 goals in the tricky conditions for a personal haul of 22 points as the Australian's took a 1–0 series lead with a convincing 38–16 win. Although soundly beaten, the Lions gave their fans something to cheer in the second half by providing something of a fightback, culminating in Joe Lydon sprinting 60 metres and out-pacing Garry Jack to score in the corner. Lydon's try created Ashes history as it was the first time in 97 tests between the two sides that a British fullback had scored a try.

This game saw Don Furner play a couple of players out of position with Brett Kenny and Noel Cleal on the wings.

With the exception of Mal Meninga on the wing in place of a resting Michael O'Connor (Meninga had played for St Helens in 1984–85 and remained a crowd favourite at Knowsley Road), the Kangaroos played with the expected 2nd Test line up. Dale Shearer had replaced the injured Les Kiss on the wing and highlighted his return to the top side with a 70-metre intercept try in the first half that in effect gave a clean bill of health to a previously injured groin muscle.

Steve Roach's tour effectively ended after dislocating his elbow during the match which would see Don Furner use Paul Dunn in the front row for the second test.

Oldham put up a spirited display against the Kangaroos before going down by the closest score of the tour, 22–16. This would be the last time the touring Kangaroos would play Oldham.

2nd Ashes Test
Great Britain coach Maurice Bamford surprisingly made only one change to the team that had lost heavily in Manchester. Centre Ellery Hanley was ruled out through injury and replaced by St. Helens winger Barry Ledger, with Tony Marchant moving from the wing to partner Garry Schofield in the centres. Bamford came in for heavy criticism from former Great Britain and England internationals for his selections. For the Kangaroos, Dale Shearer made his return to the Test team replacing the injured Les Kiss on the wing, while Canterbury-Bankstown forward Paul Dunn returned to the team in the front row replacing Steve Roach who had dislocated his elbow in the win over St. Helens.

After an even start, during which the Lions had made a couple of line breaks that had the Australian defence scrambling, the Kangaroos ran riot in the second Test, wrapping up The Ashes with a six tries to one, 34–4 win in front of 30,808 at Elland Road. The Lions only try came late in the game. Australia led 34-0 when Kangaroos fullback Garry Jack, who had scored two tries, pushed a pass 10 metres from his line to Michael O'Connor. The Aussie winger dropped the ball (which was bullet like and at his knees) and it was pounced upon by Schofield who scored only 15 metres wide of the posts. Lee Crooks missed the relatively easy conversion of his team's only try, summing up the Lions day. Such was the Kangaroos dominance that this was the only kick at goal the Lions managed throughout the match.

Bob Lindner scored the opening try of the game after backing up a strong burst up the middle by Noel Cleal. O'Connor converted the try and was also next to score after taking a cut-out pass from Peter Sterling near his own quarter line. After racing around the Lions defence, O'Connor kicked ahead as Joe Lydon loomed and easily won the 55 metre race to the ball for the try. He converted his own try to give Australia a 12–0 lead which they took into half time. The floodgates opened in the second though and the Kangaroos blew the Lions away with a powerful performance. Two tries to Garry Jack and one each to Wally Lewis and Brett Kenny saw Australia leading 34-0 before Schofield's try at least gave the crowd something to cheer. Before Kenny's try with the score at 28–0, the crowd, far from impressed with the Lions performance, had even begun to chant "What a load of rubbish" (clearly audible on the television coverage) and were actually applauding the Kangaroos open style of play.

In his television commentary of the game, former Australian dual-rugby international and 1959-60 Kangaroo tour vice-captain Rex Mossop summed up the game when calling Brett Kenny's try, stating that "Australia carved them up. They've decimated, dissected and absolutely diabolically destroyed this Great Britain side today".

Kangaroos second rower Noel Cleal broke his arm in the game against Hull which ended his tour. Peter Sterling, who had played for Hull during the 1984–85 English season and led them to the Challenge Cup Final, was given the honour of captaining the Kangaroos against his former club. After breaking his thumb during the first half of the second tour game against Hull Kingston Rovers at Craven Park, Des Hasler returned to the side off the bench and scored two tries.

This match was played in heavy rain and fog. The match saw the most even spread of Australia's "Kangaroos" and "Emu's" (midweek) teams on the tour with 7 non-test and 8 test players in the selected XV.

3rd Ashes Test
This match also counted as part of the 1985–88 Rugby League World Cup and was the only match of the series played at a regular rugby league ground, the first two Tests having been played in soccer stadiums to take advantage of the greater spectator capacity. It was also the last Ashes Test in England played at a club home ground until the 2001 Kangaroo tour.

The only Australian team change from the second Test win was Mal Meninga coming off the bench into the second row to replace the injured Noel Cleal (broken arm) with South Sydney forward Les Davidson named on the bench in his Test debut. With the loss of Cleal, Australian coach Don Furner was mulling over whom to replace him with when team captain Wally Lewis suggested moving Meninga to the back row, reasoning that there would be little disruption to the team as both Mal and "Crusher" Cleal were roughly the same size and were fast, skilled players who played a similar style of game. After heavy criticism of his selections for the first two tests from a number of former Great Britain internationals, Maurice Bamford made five changes to the Lions with the recall of halfback Andy Gregory, centre David Stephenson, winger John Basnett and back rowers Chris Burton and Harry Pinner.

As with the 1982 Ashes series, the third Test was the most genuinely contested of the Tests played, with the Lions putting in a much improved performance. Centre Gene Miles opened the scoring in the early minutes of the game, with lock forward Bob Lindner also scoring soon after. Successful conversions by Michael O'Connor saw the Kangaroos lead 12-0 after just 15 minutes and another rout looked on the cards. However, the Lions dug deep and tries to Garry Schofield either side of half time saw the game tied at 12-all with the Lions looking like winners for the first time in the series. The game was in the balance until French referee Julien Rascagneres awarded a penalty try to Australian winger Dale Shearer after he was illegally tackled by his opposite John Basnett when both were chasing the ball which Shearer had kicked downfield. A penalty goal to Joe Lydon and a field goal by Schofield reduced the deficit to 18–15, but Wally Lewis then put the result beyond doubt with a try after bamboozling the Lions defence with two dummies near the sideline before racing around to score beside the posts.

France

First Test

Second Test
Australia's win over France in the final match of the tour, which counted as part of the ongoing 1985-88 World Cup tournament, was a record margin for a Test match.

Statistics
Leading Try Scorer
 19 by Terry Lamb

Leading Point Scorer
 170 by Michael O'Connor (13 tries, 59 goals)

Largest Attendance
 50,583 - First test vs Great Britain at Old Trafford

Largest Club Game Attendance
 30,662 - Australia vs Wigan at Central Park

References

External links
1986 Kangaroo Tour of Great Britain and France at rl1908.com
1986 Kangaroo Tour of Great Britain and France at rlhalloffame.org.uk
Ashes Series 1986 at rugbyleagueproject.com
1986 Kangaroos at the Sport Australia Hall of Fame
Invincibles Again: 1986 Kangaroo Tour highlights Pt.1
Invincibles Again: 1986 Kangaroo Tour highlights Pt.2

Kangaroo Tour
Kangaroo Tour
Kan
Rugby league tours of France
Rugby league tours of Great Britain
Australia national rugby league team tours
1986 in Papua New Guinea rugby league